Émilie Jouvet (born 29 July 1976) is a French filmmaker, photographer and contemporary artist.

Biography 
In 2006 she directed her first feature, a post-porn and feminist pro-gender queer lesbian and transgender film, One Night Stand.

In 2009 she assembled an ephemeral troupe of performers, consisting of Wendy Delorme, Judy Minx, DJ Metzgerei, Mad Kate, Sadie Lune and Madison Young, for a European tour during the shooting of her film Too Much Pussy! Feminist Sluts, A Queer X Show. This feminist sex-positive, documentary road movie came out in French cinemas in 2010.

Her first monograph of photographs, 'Émilie Jouvet The Book', was published by Womart editions in 2014.

Filmography

Short films 
 2013 : Safer, 3 min, Coproduction Yagg Inpes (Fr)
 2013 : Candy Box  6 min, Coproduction Yagg Inpes (Fr)
 2011 : Let it go 3 min.
 2008 : The apple 6 min, Coproduction Émilie Jouvet, Judy Minx. Distribution Bildkraft (GER), PetraJoy (ENGL)
 2008 : Kiss me 20 min.
 2008 : Party time 4 min.
 2008 : Memories 4 min 30 s.
 2007 : Vicious 5 min.
 2005 : Blind porn 3 min 30 s.
 2004 : Roof 8 min 30 s.
 2004 : Electric desire 3 min 20 s.
 2004 : Blancx 3 min 30 s.
 2003 : Kissing 4 min.
 2003 : 'Mademoiselle 4 min 20 s.
 2003 : Être une femme 3 min 45 s.

Feature films 
 2004 : Queerft : Queer Factory Tales (Les contes de Queer Factory) (segment "Blanc X") (segment "Electric Desire") (segment "Roof")
 2006 : One Night Stand (Pour une nuit)
 2010 : Too Much Pussy! Feminists Sluts in The Queer X Show
 2011 : Fucking Different XXX (segment "New Kid on the Block")
 2011 : Much More Pussy!
 2011 : Histoire d'Ovidie, 55 min, French Lover Production (FR),   Diffusion Canal plus (FR).

Awards and nominations 
 2006 : First Prize, Porn Film Festival Berlin - One Night Stand
 2007 : First Prize, Amsterdam Porn Film Festival - One Night Stand
 2008 : Special Prize of the Jury, Copenhagen Gay and Lesbian Film Festival - One Night Stand
 2009 : Sexiest Dyke Movie Price, Feminist Porn Awards, Toronto - One Night Stand
 2009 : First Prize, International Best Short Film Competition, Madrid Film Fest - The Apple
 2009 : Jury Award for Most Innovative Short Film, Seattle Lesbian and Gay Film Festival - The Apple
 2010 : Prix One+One (Prix de la critique), Festival international du film de Belfort-Entrevues - TOO MUCH PUSSY ! Feminists Sluts in The Queer X Show
 2010 : Prix spécial du jury, Porn Film Festival Berlin - Much More Pussy.
 2011 : Audience Award Best Documentary, Reelout Queer Film Festival, Kingston, Canada - TOO MUCH PUSSY ! Feminists Sluts in The Queer X Show
 2011 : Best LGBT film, Cannes Independent Film Festival - TOO MUCH PUSSY ! Feminists Sluts in The Queer X Show
 2012 : Prix du festival PorYes Feminist Porn Awards Europe, Berlin - Much More Pussy.

References

See also 
 Official Website

French cinema articles needing attention
1976 births
Living people
French filmmakers
French photographers
French contemporary artists